Georgi Stanislavovich Kuchiyev (born 1 January 1998) is a Russian football player.

Club career
He made his debut in the Russian Football National League for FC Tyumen on 20 July 2015 in a game against FC Sibir Novosibirsk.

References

External links
 Profile by Russian Football National League

1998 births
Sportspeople from Vladikavkaz
Living people
Russian footballers
Association football forwards
FC Tyumen players
FC Spartak Vladikavkaz players
FC Inter Cherkessk players
FC Dynamo Stavropol players
FC Mashuk-KMV Pyatigorsk players
Russian First League players
Russian Second League players